Pamphile was the legendary first weaver of silk in Greek tradition.

Pamphile may also refer to:
 Pamphile (card game), also called Mistigri, an old French card game
 Pamphile of Epidaurus, first-century historian
 Père Pamphile, fictional character in Abbé Jules by Octave Mirbeau (1888)

See also
 Pamphilus (disambiguation)
 Saint-Pamphile, Quebec